The Simp is an extant 1920 silent comedy film starring Lloyd Hamilton. It is a Hamilton and Jack White production distributed by Educational Pictures. The film was directed by Owen Davis and Arthur Roch.

A dog features in one of its episodes. Various filming techniques are used to comedic effect. The cast features a man bumbling through various scenarios. It was also released as a Pathescope film.

A colored lobby card for the film picturing Hamilton, Marvel Rea, and a dog survives.

Billy Dooley used a similar wringing out the wet dog routine in the 1926 film Briny Boob as did Shemp Howard in the 1952 film He Cooked His Goose.

Cast
Lloyd Hamilton
Marvel Rea
Otto Fries
Jess Weldon

References

1920 films